Best Laid Plans is a studio album from Sandra McCracken, recorded in late 2003 with engineer, Ray Kennedy (Twang Trust) and Peter Collins.

In the summer of 2004, Sandra signed the album to Shell Records in London. Shell released the album in the UK, followed by two radio singles, Last Goodbye and No More Tears, which received significant airplay and attention across England, Scotland, Wales and Ireland.

Track listing
 "Plenty" – 4:18
 "Last Goodbye" – 3:03
 "No More Tears" – 3:40
 "Find You Out (What Matters)" – 3:22
 "500 Miles" – 3:53
 "Where Do You Go To My Lovely" – 4:48
 "Took You For Granted" – 3:21
 "Sons of Cain" – 3:17
 "Letters" – 3:37
 "Stay (Missing Evidence)" – 3:20
 "Age After Age" – 4:31

Notes and references
 See SandraMcCracken.com, official website, articles about Best Laid Plans.
 See MusicOMH Review of Best Laid Plans

External Resources

2004 albums
Albums produced by Peter Collins (record producer)
Sandra McCracken albums